Bloodstained Heroes is the third release of the Finnish progressive metal band Crimson Lotus. It was released on December 23, 2006. Original album artwork created by Pekka Aalto, mostly from material by Lydia C. Burris. Mastered by Pirkka Rännäli.

Guest musicians: Matti Auerkallio (vocals).

Track listing
 Bloodstained Heroes — 3:44
 Contemplation – 3:35
 Unpleasant Shades of Gray – 4:11

External links 
 

2006 EPs